This is a list of newspapers in Haiti.

Current 
Balistrad, est. 2018 (Haitian online newspaper (media))
Le Nouvelliste, est. 1898
 , est. 2015
Le Matin, est. 1907
 Le Moniteur, Port-au-Prince, est. 1845 (official journal)
Haïti Liberté, est. 2007 (weekly, print and online)
Haïti Observateur
Haïti en Marche (weekly)
Haïti Progrès (weekly)

Defunct
 Le Cap, est. 1804 in Cap-Haïtien
 Courrier du Soir
 L'Essor
 Feuille du Commerce, Port-au-Prince
 Gazette des Tribuneaux
 Haiti Commerciale, Industrielle et Agricole
 Haiti-Journal
 Haiti Sun (est. 1950)
 L'Informateur Haitien
 Journal du Commerce, active 1820s? in Cap-Haïtien
 Le Manifeste, Port-au-Prince
 Le Telegraphe, Port-au-Prince
 Le Temps, Port-au-Prince
 L'Union, Port-au-Prince

See also
 Media of Haiti
 Haitian literature
 List of newspapers
 Balistrad

References

Bibliography
  
  (6 volumes, 1993–1997)

External links

ABYZ News links - Haiti newspapers and news media guide
newspaper index
Balistrad
Haiti en Marche
Haiti Progres
Le Nouvelliste
 

Haiti
 
Newspapers